Islam Shokry (born 1 January 1983) is an Egyptian footballer currently playing with Egyptian club Tersana. He was a member of the Egyptian U-21 youth team that won the 2003 African Youth Championship and  participated in the 2003 FIFA World Youth Championship held in the UAE.

Career
Shokry witnessed the golden age of Arab Contractors FC winning the 2003-04 Egyptian Cup against the African club of century Al Ahly, followed by the 2004 Egyptian Super Cup title against the other Egyptian giant Zamalek.

In August 2008, Shokry joined Lierse SK, which was competing in the Belgian Second Division at the time. He had a short spell with Lierse SK in Belgium. Although he managed to score many goals in the pre-seasons, he had tough time getting regular first-time football competing the team's captain Jurgen Cavens and former Fulham F.C. striker Tomasz Radzinski. So he moved on loan to K.V. Turnhout for the rest of the 2008-09 season. Scoring a debut goal and following it with many other goals.

In January 2010, Shokry joined Tersana.

Honors

Arab Contractors FC
 Egyptian Cup: the 2003–04
 Egyptian Super Cup: 2004

Egypt
 African Youth Championship: 2003

References

External links
 
 

1983 births
Living people
Egyptian footballers
Egyptian expatriate footballers
Al Mokawloon Al Arab SC players
Ismaily SC players
Olympic Club (Egypt) players
Tersana SC players
Egyptian Premier League players
Expatriate footballers in Belgium
Association football forwards